Gamsylella is a genus comprising 4 species of fungi in the family Orbiliaceae. It is found in Australia.

The genus name of Gamsylella is in honour of Konrad Walter Gams (1934 - 2017), who was an Austrian botanist and scientist.

The genus was circumscribed by Markus Scholler, Gregor Hagedorn and Annemarthe Rubner in Sydowia Vol.51 on page 108 in 1999.

Species
Gamsylella gephyropaga (Drechsler) M. Scholler, Hagedorn & A. Rubner 1999
Gamsylella lobata (Dudd.) M. Scholler, Hagedorn & A. Rubner 1999
Gamsylella phymatopaga (Drechsler) M. Scholler, Hagedorn & A. Rubner 1999
Gamsylella robusta (J.S. McCulloch) M. Scholler, Hagedorn & A. Rubner 1999

References

External links
 http://www.indexfungorum.org

Helotiales